Big Freeze is a hypothetical scenario where the universe continues to expand forever and eventually all matter reaches a final uniform state.

Big Freeze is also a hypothetical scenario in the future the universe in which the Universe is infinitely filled with phantom energy.

Big Freeze may also refer to:
 The Great Frost of 1709
 The winter of 1946–47 in the United Kingdom
 The winter of 1962–63 in the United Kingdom
 1987 United Kingdom and Ireland cold wave
 The winter of 2009–10 in Great Britain and Ireland
 The Big Freeze (film), a 1993 silent film by director Eric Sykes
 The Land Before Time VIII: The Big Freeze, a 2001 direct-to-video animated adventure musical film, directed by Charles Grosvenor
 The Big Freeze at the 'G, an annual charity event held at the Australian Football League's Queen's Birthday match
 The Big Freeze, a book by Philip Reeve in the Buster Bayliss series
 "Big Freeze" (song), a song by Muse, from the album The 2nd Law
 The Big Freeze (album), a 2019 album by Laura Stevenson

See also

 Big Chill (disambiguation)